James D. Dotsch (March 9, 1904 – November 24, 1986) was an American politician who was a Democratic member of the Michigan State Senate, representing the 30th District from 1937 to 1940. When he was elected he was 32 years old.

Dotsch was born in Garden, Michigan, son of Henry R. Dotsch and Katherine Kelly. He was the father of Roland "Rollie" Dotsch.

References

1904 births
1986 deaths
People from Delta County, Michigan
Democratic Party Michigan state senators
20th-century American politicians